Paggor is a township in Nyêmo County of the Lhasa prefecture-level city in the  Tibet Autonomous Region of China. It lies roughly 75 miles west of Lhasa north of the Brahmaputra river at an altitude of 4465 metres (14,652 feet). 

It lies approximately 18.7 miles north of Qamqenxoi.

See also
List of towns and villages in Tibet

Populated places in Lhasa (prefecture-level city)
Township-level divisions of Tibet
Nyêmo County